Palmers Green railway station, in Aldermans Hill, is in the London Borough of Enfield in north London, located within Travelcard Zone 4. The station and all trains serving it are operated by Great Northern.

The station was originally named Palmer's Green & Southgate.

There is a regular Sunday community market in the station car park. Platform 1 has a sheltered waiting room.

Services
All services at Palmers Green are operated by Great Northern using  EMUs.

The typical off-peak service in trains per hour is:
 2 tph to 
 2 tph to  via 

Connections
London Buses routes 121, W6 and 616 serve the station.

References

External links

Railway stations in the London Borough of Enfield
Former Great Northern Railway stations
Railway stations in Great Britain opened in 1871
Railway stations served by Govia Thameslink Railway
Railway station